A selkie is a mythological creature found in Faroese, Icelandic, Irish, and Scottish folklore.

Selkie may refer to:
Selkie (film), a 2000 Australian film
Selkies, an android  race in the Final Fantasy Crystal Chronicles universe
 Selkie, Finland, a town in central-eastern  Finland

See also
"Selkies: The Endless Obsession", song from Alaska by Between the Buried and Me
Seelkee, a lake monster from Canada
Silkie (disambiguation)